Edwin Henry Nevin (May 9, 1814 in Shippensburg, Pennsylvania – June 2, 1889 in Philadelphia, Pennsylvania) was a former President of Franklin College in New Athens, Ohio, serving from 1840 to 1845.

References

1814 births
1889 deaths
Academics from Pennsylvania
Franklin College (New Athens, Ohio)
People from Shippensburg, Pennsylvania
Washington & Jefferson College alumni